Honokaa High & Intermediate School is a public, co-educational high school and middle school of the Hawaii State Department of Education. It serves grades seven through twelve and was established in 1889. It was added to the Hawaiʻi Register of Historic Places in 2002 under its former name, Honokaa High & Elementary School.

General information
Honokaa High & Intermediate School is located in Honokaa in Hawaii County on the Island of Hawaii.  The campus is at coordinates , 45-527 Pakalana Street, on both the same side, and across the street from Honokaa Elementary School, one of its three feeder schools. The others are Waimea Middle School and Paauilo Intermediate School.  The mascot is the Dragon and its school colors are green and gold.

History
Honokaa School was started in 1889 for students from the Hamakua Coastal Sugar Cane Communities and children of Parker Ranch workers. The high school was established a few years later. The weak public interest eventually grew stronger as the public realized the benefits from a high school on the Hamakua Coast of the Big Island.
The school, originally known as Honokaa High & Elementary, was located at its original location on the eastern side of Pakalana Street, and in 1957 was expanded to include new elementary school buildings and a cafeteria on the western side of Pakalana Street. In the early 2000s, the school was broken up into Honokaa High & Intermediate School and Honokaa Elementary School. Honokaa High & Intermediate School's rival is Kohala High School.

Alma Mater
Beneath the calm blue azure skies,

Our Alma Mater lies.

The glorious creed we onward bare,

We will fail thee never.

To highest goals we forward march,

With never failing vigor.

We're first and last and always for,

The green and gold forever.

The green and gold our colors dear,

The green and gold forever.

We're one and all and always for,

The green and gold forever!

Clubs
Honokaa High & Intermediate School supports clubs that include:
 Academic Decathlon
 National Honors Society
 Fishing Club
 Future Farmers of America
 Robotics
 Science Club
 Student Body Government

Notable alumni
 Kaulana Noa (born 1976), former American football offensive guard drafted by the St. Louis Rams in the 2000 NFL Draft.
 Poncie Ponce (born 1933), actor, musician and stand-up comedian
 Dwight Takamine (born 1953), former Hawai'i State Representative and Senator
 Yoshito Takamine (1924–2015), former Hawai'i State Representative and labor leader
 John David Waiheʻe III (born 1946), fourth Governor of Hawaiʻi from 1986 to 1994

References

External links
Honoka'a High & Intermediate School Official Website

Educational institutions established in 1889
Public high schools in Hawaii County, Hawaii
Public schools in Hawaii County, Hawaii
Middle schools in Hawaii County, Hawaii
Public middle schools in Hawaii
1889 establishments in Hawaii
Hawaii Register of Historic Places in Hawaii County, Hawaii